Benjamin Reichwald (born 9 April 1994), known professionally as Bladee, is a Swedish rapper, singer, record producer, designer and member of the artistic collective Drain Gang. Reichwald has released music through the Stockholm record label YEAR0001 from his debut album Eversince in 2016 through to his most recent album, Spiderr, in 2022. In addition to his music, Reichwald creates visual art, which frequently appears as cover art for his releases. Reichwald also serves as the creative director for Yung Lean's clothing line Sadboys Gear.

Early life 
Benjamin Reichwald was born 9 April 1994 in Stockholm, Sweden and was raised mainly in the Skanstull area. It was here where, in 2004, he met fellow Gravity Boys member Zak Arogundade, also known as Ecco2K. The two were classmates and formed punk band Krossad (Swedish for 'crushed') when Reichwald was 13, which led to Reichwald's interest in music.

After leaving school, Reichwald began to get into making music whilst working at a daycare centre.

Career

Music 
Reichwald released a few tracks in 2011 under the name Ken Burns, but properly began releasing music in 2012. He eventually became friends with Swedish rapper Yung Lean, who was a friend of Reichwald's brother. Reichwald eventually sent a message to Sad Boys member Yung Sherman on SoundCloud, asking to collaborate, which resulted in a working relationship between his own Gravity Boys collective and Lean's Sad Boys Entertainment. Reichwald and Lean then made "Heal You // Bladerunner" from Lean's Unknown Death 2002 mixtape, which gave him attention from Lean's fanbase.

Reichwald released his debut-mixtape, GLUEE in 2014 on the YEAR0001 label which was described as the "summertime anthem for a suburban generation stuck scrolling through Twitter." The mixtape was successful on the audio distribution platform SoundCloud, racking up over 2 million plays. This mixtape, coupled with several singles going viral and features on Yung Lean's debut mixtape Unknown Death 2002 was able to rocket Bladee into underground hip hop fame.

Reichwald released his debut album, Eversince on 25 May 2016. The album received mixed reviews from mainstream outlets, but was well received by underground and experimental critics. In 2017, Reichwald teamed up with production group Working on Dying to release his second mixtape, named after the group. The next year, his second album, Red Light, released.

Reichwald's third mixtape, Icedancer, was released 28 December 2018. This album was executively produced by Australian collective Ripsquadd featuring production from Whitearmor and PJ Beats. In April 2020, Reichwald released EXETER, a nine-song album he recorded whilst in Gotland with Gud. It is the first Bladee project produced by Gud on the YEAR0001 label.

In July 2020, Reichwald released his fourth album and second project of 2020, 333 via YEAR0001. The album was produced primarily by Whitearmor, with additional production coming from close collaborators Gud, Mechatok, and Lusi (Ripsquadd member), as well as Joakim Benon of the Swedish band JJ. Notable is the absence of any vocal features, especially of longtime collaborator and fellow Drain Gang member Ecco2K, who contributed to the previous 3 Bladee albums.

In December 2020, Reichwald released his third and final project of 2020, Good Luck via YEAR0001, entirely produced by Mechatok. Both Reichwald and Mechatok performed all of the tracks on the album as well as an additional set from Mechatok in a livestreamed performance on 10 December, the same day the album was released.

In May 2021, Reichwald released his fourth studio album, The Fool via YEAR0001. The album was executively produced by frequent collaborator Lusi.

In January 2022, Reichwald released the single Amygdala in collaboration with Ecco2k and Mechatok. That same year, a collaborative project, Crest, with Ecco2K was released via YEAR0001 in March. The project was recorded in Spring 2020.

On 30 September 2022, Reichwald released Spiderr. In January 2023, Bladee featured on the Skrillex song Real Spring.

Art and fashion 
In July 2018, Reichwald and fellow Drain Gang member Ecco2K walked Alyx Studio's S/S 2019 menswear show in Paris, on invitation from Matthew Williams.

During July and August 2021, Reichwald exhibited his first solo collection of paintings Real Sprin9 at the Residence Gallery in London.

In September 2021, Reichwald released a capsule Drain Gang collection in collaboration with the American-Swedish clothing brand GANT.

Musical style 
Reichwald has described his style as "pain" though saying, as of 2018, he had "evolved into some sort of auto-tuned dark angel". He often experiments, incorporating various genres. He has stated that he finds the process therapeutic.

In an interview with Reichwald, Jack Angell, a music writer for The Fader, described Reichwald's sound as "frostbitten futurism" and remarked that Reichwald's music evokes "a wide spectrum of emotion". He has received attention for his collaborations and live performances with Yung Lean.

Reichwald has cited Chief Keef, Lil B, The Beach Boys, Basshunter, and James Ferraro as influences on his work.

Discography

Studio albums 
 Eversince (2016)
 Red Light (2018)
 Exeter (2020)
 333 (2020)
 Good Luck (2020) (with Mechatok)
 The Fool (2021)
 Crest (2022) (with Ecco2K)
 Spiderr (2022)

Mixtapes 
 Gluee (2014)
 Working on Dying (2017)
 Icedancer (2018)

Extended plays 
 Rip Bladee (2016)
 Plastic Surgery (2017)
 Sunset in Silver City (2018)
 Exile (2018)
 Vanilla Sky (2019)

Collaborative projects 
 GTBSG Compilation (2013) (with Thaiboy Digital, Ecco2K, Yung Lean, Whitearmor, Yung Sherman)
 AvP (2016) (with Thaiboy Digital)
 D&G (2017) (with Ecco2k, Thaiboy Digital)
 Trash Island (2019) (with Ecco2k, Thaiboy Digital)
 Crest (2022) (with Ecco2K, Whitearmor)

Singles 
 "Into Dust" (2014)
 "Dragonfly" (2014)
 "Destroy Me" (2017)
 "Gotham City" (2017) (with Yung Lean)
 "Sesame Street" (2018)
 "I Chose to Be This Way" (2018) (with 16yrold, Skys)
 "Trash Star" (2019)
 "Undergone" (2020) (with Ssaliva)
 "Amygdala" (2022) (with Ecco2k, Mechatok)
 "Drain Story" (2022)
 "Real Spring" (2023) (with Skrillex)

References

External links 
 
 

1994 births
Living people
Swedish rappers
Musicians from Stockholm